Jean de Clercq (17 May 1905, in Antwerp, Belgium - 20 March 1984) was a Belgian footballer.

He played as a midfielder for Royal Antwerp FC, where he played 219 league games  and for the Belgium team. He was named to the squad for the 1930 World Cup in Montevideo.

He was coach of the Great Old from 1949 to 1953, with the former goalkeeper for the club, Richard Gedopt.

Honours 
 International from 1930 to  1933 (11 caps)
 Played in the 1930 World Cup (1 match)
 Champion of Belgium in 1929 and 1931 with Royal Antwerp FC

References 

Belgian footballers
Belgium international footballers
K. Beerschot V.A.C. players
Royal Antwerp F.C. players
1930 FIFA World Cup players
Belgian football managers
Royal Antwerp F.C. managers
1905 births
Footballers from Antwerp
1984 deaths
Association football midfielders